The 1994 Top Rank Classic was a  professional non-ranking snooker tournament that took place between 9 and 14 September 1994. Five players participated and it was won by Stephen Hendry.


Results
If points were level then most frames won determined their positions. If two players had an identical record then the result in their match determined their positions.

 
 
 Ken Doherty 6–5 Alan McManus
 James Wattana 8–3 Darren Morgan
 
 Ken Doherty 7–4 Darren Morgan
 Stephen Hendry 7–4 Darren Morgan
 James Wattana 7–4 Ken Doherty
 
 Alan McManus 7–4 Darren Morgan

References

Snooker non-ranking competitions
1994 in snooker
1994 in Thai sport